This is the filmography of Hong Kong singer and actor Aaron Kwok.

Film

Television series

References

Kwok, Aaron